The Marion Hotel is a historic hotel in Ocala, Florida, United States. It is located at 108 North Magnolia Avenue. On October 16, 1980, it was added to the U.S. National Register of Historic Places.

Gallery

References

External links
 Marion County listings at National Register of Historic Places
 Marion County listings at Florida's Office of Cultural and Historical Programs
 Early Ocala Hotels (Ocala Government site)

Buildings and structures in Ocala, Florida
National Register of Historic Places in Marion County, Florida